Doll Graveyard is a 2005 horror film released by Full Moon Features and directed by Charles Band. It involves four dolls that are possessed by the spirit of a young girl and come to life with murderous intentions.

Plot
Los Angeles 1911: Cyril, an abusive father  finds his daughter Sophia, playing in a room she’s not supposed to be in. As punishment, he forces her to bury her four beloved handmade dolls (an African warrior, a German soldier, a porcelain girl, and a samurai) in their backyard, despite her pleas. When Sophia accidentally falls into the doll’s grave and breaks her neck, Cyril buries her with the dolls to conceal the accident, unknowingly with his gold pocket watch.

Los Angeles, 2005: the house is now occupied by the Fillbrook family: Nerdy high school freshman Guy (who collects limited edition action figures), his slightly older teenage sister Deedee, and their single father Lester. Lester prepares for a date, instructing DeeDee to babysit Guy while he is out as well as giving them chores: Guy is tasked with yard work while DeeDee is told to clean up the house. While raking, Guy discovers a Samurai’s miniature katana sticking up from the dirt and eventually digs up the Samurai doll himself. Before Lester leaves, DeeDee catches him staring hypnotized at a gold pocket watch, which he says he found in the backyard. Once he leaves, DeeDee invites her friends, promiscuous part girl Olivia and shy Terri over to party. Olivia secretly invites two boys, Tom and Rich, who regularly bully Guy. Guy agrees to keep the party a secret after Terri is nice to him away from the others and they discuss action figures.

The boys ambush Guy in his room once they arrive, insult him, tie his hands up, and break one of his precious action figures before leaving to party with the girls. This angers Sophia’s spirit which possesses the samurai doll, resurrects the other buried dolls and puts Guy (whose hands are still tied) in a trance-like state.

DeeDee takes Tom upstairs to have sex after everyone (except Terri) smoke and drink. She handcuffs Tom and begins to take his clothes off before going to a closet to grab “something else”. While she’s searching her closet, the German Soldier enters the room and stabs Tom in the crotch with his elongated pickelhaube. Hearing his screams, DeeDee tries to help him while calling downstairs for help. Downstairs, the music is too loud for Olivia to hear who is dancing by herself after Rich refused her advances. Terri insists on cleaning up before Lester returns home and Rich, wanting to have sex with Terri, offers to help her clean. She refuses him and goes upstairs to find Guy. Olivia goes upstairs to DeeDee and Tom, who’s bled out, when the German Soldier, who’s equipped with a tiny Luger, begins shooting at them. They run downstairs in time to see Ooga Booga standing on a table of a heavily intoxicated Rich. The doll stabs Rich’s eye with his spear then slices his throat, killing him.

Upstairs, Terri finds Guy and frees him when the Samurai tries attacking her but stops when Guy commands it to. They make their way downstairs where DeeDee and Olivia are trying to get her cell phone from the porcelain girl doll. The doll, who’s face is cracked open in a jagged smile, attacks Olivia biting her face and hand and DeeDee starts hitting it with a fire poker when Sophia possesses Guy. While possessed, he protects the dolls and calling himself Sophia. He knocks over a vase just as his father walks through the front door, mirroring the first scene of the movie when Cyril finds Sophia in the forbidden room. Lester is seemingly hypnotized by Cyril’s watch into acting like Cyril and starts berating Guy/Sophia. The dolls all attack Lester at once which snaps him out of his trance. He calls out to Guy which seems to break Sophia’s possession over him. Guy gathers the dolls and insists they bury them again to put Sophia’s spirit at rest, which they do immediately. As the girls stand together looking at the dolls in the hole, Guy slips behind a stone pillar and the camera slowly follows him around the corner, revealing a zombified Sophia staring back at the viewer.

Cast and Characters
Jared Kusnitz as Guy Fillbrook, a nerdy high school freshman who collects special edition action figures
Gabrielle Lynn as DeeDee Fillbrook, a few years older than Guy but still in high school 
Anna Alicia Brock as Terri, DeeDee’s newer friend, she’s shy and shares an interest in Guy and his action figures 
Kristyn Green as Olivia, DeeDee’s promiscuous friend, she has previously hooked up with Rich
Brian Lloyd as Rich, a jock who bullies Guy
Scott Seymour as Tom, a jock who bullies Guy
Ken Lyle as Lester Fillbrook/Cyril Lester is DeeDee & Guy’s single father / Cyril is Sophia’s abusive father, both characters are portrayed by Ken Lyle
Hannah Marks as Sophia, a young girl who dies accidentally and is buried by Cyril, now a vengeful spirit

The Dolls
 Ooga Booga - possibly modeled after an African warrior, the character is a reference to the Zuni fetish doll from Trilogy of Terror and carries a sharp spear. The spin off film, Ooga Booga, stars Karen Black who, decades before, starred in the original Trilogy of Terror.
 German Soldier - carries a mini Luger pistol and has a helmet with a long metal spike on top of it
 Porcelain Girl - her face is cracked open in a way that gives her an ear to ear grin of jagged porcelain (a Glasgow smile)
 Samurai - carries a mini katana

Release
The film was initially released in October 2005 on DVD. It has since been included in several DVD collections of Full Moon films or other straight-to-DVD horrors.

Reception
Critical reaction to the film has been mixed to negative.

DreadCentral.com gave the film a mostly negative review saying that while the dolls featured in the film are somewhat intriguing in their gimmicks but ultimately pale imitations of some of Band’s previous puppet and doll creations. The reviewer, Jon Condit, also compared Doll Graveyard to Full Moon’s other film released around the same time, The Gingerdead Man, but cites the latter film’s supporting characters as being more interesting than those in the former. Condit awarded the film 2/5 knives (stars).

Spin off
Ooga Booga, a film based on the African warrior doll, was released March 12, 2013.

In Popular culture
The doll Ooga Booga has appeared multiple times in the Evil Bong film series, another Full Moon franchise. In the first film, masturbating to strippers in the Bong World. In Evil Bong 420, attacking a redneck, And in The Gingerweed Man, as a secondary protagonist.

See also
 Killer Toys

References

External links

 
 
Full Moon Direct (official site)

2005 horror films
2005 films
American supernatural horror films
Films directed by Charles Band
Puppet films
Films about sentient toys
Horror films about toys
Sentient toys in fiction
2000s English-language films
2000s American films